Jude Ise-Idehen (7 June 1969 – 1 July 2022) was a Nigerian politician from the Peoples Democratic Party. He represented Egor/Ikpoba-Okha in the House of Representatives.

See also 

 List of members of the House of Representatives of Nigeria, 2019–2023

References 

1969 births
2022 deaths
Peoples Democratic Party (Nigeria) politicians
People from Edo State
Members of the House of Representatives (Nigeria)
Peoples Democratic Party members of the House of Representatives (Nigeria)
Edo State politicians